Drohi in Hindi or Antham in Telugu is a 1992 Indian neo-noir crime film written and directed by Ram Gopal Varma, filmed simultaneously in both Telugu and Hindi languages. The film starred Nagarjuna, Urmila Matondkar, Salim Ghouse, and Danny Denzongpa. The soundtrack was composed by R. D. Burman, as well as, Mani Sharma and M.M. Keeravani, who each composed one song. The background score, of the film, was composed by Mani Sharma. The Hindi version was titled Drohi. However, it released on 23 October 1992, on Diwali that year, a month after the release of the Telugu version. Both the versions, as well as the music,  received positive reviews upon release.

Plot
Raghav (Nagarjuna) is an orphan and receives assignments from an underworld gangster, J.P. Shetty (Danny Denzongpa), who hired him for contract killing, as a full-time job. Raghav leads a calm and secretive life and there is no room for relationships, in it. At a particular instance, he meets Bhavana (Urmila Matondkar), an ornithologist student, and falls in love with her innocence and charm. He hides his real identity from her and she, too, reciprocates his feelings. When things start looking hopeful for a normal life, for Raghav, Bhavana discovers his real identity and distances herself from him. The rest of the film is about what happens to the ill-fated Raghav.

Cast
Nagarjuna as Raghav / Shekhar
Urmila Matondkar as Bhavana, Inspector Krishna's sister
Danny Denzongpa as J.P. Shetty
Salim Ghouse as Inspector Krishna, Bhavana's brother 
Akash Khurana as Mayor
Rallapalli as Hotel Receptionist
Gokkina Rama Rao 
Narra Venkateswara Rao 
Horse Babu
Jaliil
Silk Smitha as special appearance in the song "Entha Sepaina"
Dubbing Janaki

Soundtrack

The songs werecomposed by R. D. Burman and the background score by Mani Sharma. The track Chalekki Undhanuko is composed by Mani Sharma and  "Gundello Dhada Dhada" is composed by M. M. Keeravani. The lyrics were written by Sirivennela Sitarama Sastry and Javed Akhtar (Hindi) and the soundtrack was released by SURYA Audio company.

Telugu Soundtrack

Hindi Soundtrack

References

External links
 
 

1992 films
Indian vigilante films
Films directed by Ram Gopal Varma
Films scored by R. D. Burman
Films scored by M. M. Keeravani
Films scored by Mani Sharma
Indian gangster films
1990s Telugu-language films
Films about contract killing
Films about contract killing in India
Fictional portrayals of the Maharashtra Police
Films about murder
Indian action films
Films about corruption
Indian multilingual films
1990s Hindi-language films
Fictional portrayals of the Andhra Pradesh Police
1992 multilingual films